Possession is an upcoming South Korean mystery thriller film directed by Kim Seong-sik, and starring Gang Dong-won, Esom, Heo Jun-ho, Lee Dong-hwi, and Kim Jong-soo. Based on hit Naver webtoon written by Fresh and illustrated by Kim Hong-tae, the film depicts a fake exorcist who can't see ghosts but solves the case with ghost-like insight, and is commissioned for a powerful possession case.

Cast 
 Gang Dong-won as Dr. Cheon
 Esom as Yoo-kyung
 Heo Jun-ho as Beom-cheon
 Lee Dong-hwi as Kang Do-ryung / Inbae 
 Kim Jong-soo as President Hwang
 Ahn Doo-ho

Production 
Gang Dong-won, Lee Dong-hwi and Esom confirmed their appearance in July 2022. The all main cast was confirmed on September 19, 2022.

Filming began on September 14, 2022.

References 

Upcoming films
2020s Korean-language films